Nicolae "Coco" Dumitrescu (8 December 1921 – 17 March 1999) was a Romanian footballer and manager. As a footballer, he played mainly as a forward and throughout his career, he won four Divizia A titles and two cups with ITA Arad and as a manager, he won two titles with the same team, also in the 1970–71 European Cup season they eliminated Feyenoord who were European champions at that time and for these performances he is considered a symbol of the club.

Club career
Nicolae "Coco" Dumitrescu was born on 8 December 1921 in Bucharest, Romania and he started to play football in 1938 at local club, Suter. In 1941 he went to play for Sparta București until 1946 when he went to play for ITA Arad where he made his Divizia A debut under coach Zoltán Opata on 22 September 1946 in a 1–1 against UD Reșița in which he scored a goal and by the end of the season he earned a total of 10 goals in 10 appearances, helping the club win the first title in its history. In the following season he helped the team win The Double, being used by coach Petre Steinbach in 27 matches in which he scored a personal record of 17 goals but he was not the team's top-goalscorer as Ladislau Bonyhádi scored 49 and Adalbert Kovács scored 19, he also played in the 3–2 victory from the 1948 Cupa României final against CFR Timișoara. In the 1950 Divizia A season he won another title with the club, being used by coach Francisc Dvorzsák in 15 matches in which he did not score, also appearing in the 1950 Cupa României final which was lost with 3–1 in front of CCA București. Dumitrescu helped The Old Lady win the 1953 Cupa României, being used by coach Coloman Braun-Bogdan in the 1–0 victory in front of CCA București from the final, Braun-Bogdan also using him in 23 matches in which he scored four goals in the 1954 Divizia A season when he and the club won the fourth title together. On 27 November 1955, Nicolae Dumitrescu made his last Divizia A appearance, playing for ITA in a 2–0 away victory against CCA București, having a total of 164 appearances with 51 goals scored in the competition, all while representing The Old Lady.

International career
Nicolae Dumitrescu played 10 games and scored two goals at international level for Romania, making his debut under coach Colea Vâlcov on 25 May 1947 in a 4–0 away victory against Albania at the 1947 Balkan Cup, a competition in which he made a total of three appearances. He scored his first goal for the national team in a friendly which ended with a 6–2 loss in front of Czechoslovakia, making his last four appearances at the 1948 Balkan Cup in which he scored a goal in a 3–2 home victory against Bulgaria.

International goals
Scores and results list Romania's goal tally first, score column indicates score after each Dumitrescu goal.

Managerial career
Nicolae Dumitrescu started his coaching career shortly after he ended his playing career at the junior squads of UTA Arad in 1956 where he stayed until 1964, a period in which he reached three national junior championship finals, winning the first two in front of Dinamo București and Farul Constanța and losing the third in front of Rapid București, also he discovered and promoted talents like Mihai Țârlea, Constantin Koszka or his stepbrother, Ion Pârcălab. He also coached Romania's under 18 national team with Gheorghe Ola, winning together the 1962 European championship. In 1965, Dumitrescu became the head coach of UTA's senior squad with whom he reached the 1966 Cupa României final which was lost with 4–0 in front of Steaua București and won two consecutive Divizia A titles in the 1968–69 and 1969–70 seasons. He also made some European performances with The Old Lady as eliminating Ernst Happel's Feyenoord in the 1970–71 European Cup who were European champions at that time and eliminating Austria Salzburg, Zagłębie Wałbrzych and Vitória Setúbal, reaching the 1971–72 UEFA Cup quarter-finals where they were eliminated by Tottenham Hotspur who would eventually win the competition. He coached UTA on several other occasions, having a total of 375 matches as manager in Divizia A, consisting of 154 victories, 80 draws and 141 losses. A book about Nicolae Dumitrescu was written by Radu Romănescu called Coco Dumitrescu, pentru totdeauna în inima Bătrânei Doamne (Coco Dumitrescu, forever in the heart of the Old Lady), which was released on 18 April 2021, a date that signified 100 years since his birth.

Personal life
His stepbrother, Ion Pârcălab was also an international footballer. Nicolae Dumitrescu died on 17 March 1999.

Honours

Player
ITA Arad
Divizia A: 1946–47, 1947–48, 1950, 1954
Cupa României: 1947–48, 1953, runner-up 1950

Manager
Romania U18
UEFA European Under-18 Championship: 1962
UTA Arad
Divizia A: 1968–69, 1969–70
Cupa României runner-up: 1965–66

Notes

References

External links

Nicolae Dumitrescu at Labtof.ro

1921 births
1999 deaths
Romanian footballers
Romania international footballers
Liga I players
FC Sportul Studențesc București players
FC UTA Arad players
Romanian football managers
FC UTA Arad managers
Association football forwards
Footballers from Bucharest